The Hodgdon Homestead Cabin was built by Jeremiah Hodgdon in 1879 in the Aspen Valley area of what became Yosemite National Park. In the 1950s the family proposed to demolish the structure. The National Park Service acquired it and moved it to its Pioneer Yosemite History Center at Wawona, where the restored cabin is part of an exhibit on early settlement and development of the Yosemite area. In addition to housing Hogdon, the cabin housed workers on the Great Sierra Wagon Road in the 1880s, as a patrol cabin for U.S. Army troops who managed the new national park in the 1890s, and as a historic landmark at the old Aspen Valley Resort.

The cabin is built of peeled logs, saddle-notched, with split log wedge chinking. A shed addition to the rear gives the structure the shape of a saltbox and is a frame structure covered with wood shingles. The cabin is fronted by a porch.

The Hodgdon Cabin was placed on the National Register of Historic Places on June 9, 1978.

See also
Other structures at the Pioneer Yosemite History Center include:
 Acting Superintendent's Headquarters
 Chris Jorgenson Studio
 Wawona Covered Bridge

References

External links

Houses completed in 1879
Houses on the National Register of Historic Places in California
National Register of Historic Places in Mariposa County, California
National Register of Historic Places in Yosemite National Park
Rustic architecture in California
Houses in Mariposa County, California
1879 establishments in California
Relocated buildings and structures in California